Monoblastus may refer to:
 Monoblastus (insect), a genus of wasps in the family Ichneumonidae
 Monoblastus, a fossil genus of echinoderms without unknown classification and with unknown validity of the taxon name